Information quality (IQ) is the quality of the content of information systems. It is often pragmatically defined as: "The fitness for use of the information provided". IQ frameworks also provides a tangible approach to assess and measure DQ/IQ in a robust and rigorous manner.

Conceptual problems 
Although this pragmatic definition is usable for most everyday purposes, specialists often use more complex models for information quality. Most information system practitioners use the term synonymously with data quality. However, as many academics make a distinction between data and information,  some will the process to guarantee confidence that particular information meets some context specific quality requirements. It has been suggested, however, that higher the quality the greater will be the confidence in meeting more general, less specific contexts.

Dimensions and metrics of information quality 

"Information quality" is a measure of the value which the information provides to the user of that information. "Quality" is often perceived as subjective and the quality of information can then vary among users and among uses of the information. Nevertheless, a high degree of quality increases its objectivity or at least the intersubjectivity. Accuracy can be seen as just one element of IQ but, depending upon how it is defined, can also be seen as encompassing many other dimensions of quality.

If not, it is perceived that often there is a trade-off between accuracy and other dimensions, aspects or elements of the information determining its suitability for any given tasks.  Richard Wang and Diane Strong propose a list of dimensions or elements used in assessing Information Quality is:

 Intrinsic IQ: accuracy, objectivity, Believability, reputation
 Contextual IQ: relevance, value-added, Timeliness, Completeness, amount of information
 Representational IQ: interpretability, format, coherence, compatibility 
 Accessibility IQ: accessibility, access security

Other authors propose similar but different lists of dimensions for analysis, and emphasize measurement and reporting as information quality metrics. Larry English prefers the term "characteristics" to dimensions. In fact, a considerable amount of information quality research involves investigating and describing various categories of desirable attributes (or dimensions) of data. Research has recently shown the huge diversity of terms and classification structures used.

While information as a distinct term has various ambiguous definitions, there's one which is more general, such as "description of events". While the occurrences being described cannot be subjectively evaluated for quality, since they're very much autonomous events in space and time, their description can—since it possesses a garnishment attribute, unavoidably attached by the medium which carried the information, from the initial moment of the occurrences being described.

In an attempt to deal with this natural phenomenon, qualified professionals primarily representing the researchers' guild, have at one point or another identified particular metrics for information quality. They could also be described as 'quality traits' of information, since they're not so easily quantified, but rather subjectively identified on an individual basis.

Quality metrics 

 Authority/verifiability
Authority refers to the expertise or recognized official status of a source. Consider the reputation of the author and publisher. When working with legal or government information, consider whether the source is the official provider of the information. Verifiability refers to the ability of a reader to verify the validity of the information irrespective of how authoritative the source is. To verify the facts is part of the duty of care of the journalistic deontology, as well as, where possible, to provide the sources of information so that they can be verified

 Scope of coverage
Scope of coverage refers to the extent to which a source explores a topic. Consider time periods, geography or jurisdiction and coverage of related or narrower topics.

 Composition and organization
Composition and organization has to do with the ability of the information source to present its particular message in a coherent, logically sequential manner.

 Objectivity
Objectivity is the bias or opinion expressed when a writer interprets or analyze facts. Consider the use of persuasive language, the source’s presentation of other viewpoints, its reason for providing the information and advertising.

 Integrity
 Adherence to moral and ethical principles; soundness of moral character
 The state of being whole, entire, or undiminished

 Comprehensiveness
 Of large scope; covering or involving much; inclusive: a comprehensive study.
 Comprehending mentally; having an extensive mental grasp.
 Insurance. covering or providing broad protection against loss.

 Validity
Validity of some information has to do with the degree of obvious truthfulness which the information carries

 Uniqueness
As much as ‘uniqueness’ of a given piece of information is intuitive in meaning, it also significantly implies not only the originating point of the information but also the manner in which it is presented and thus the perception which it conjures. The essence of any piece of information we process consists to a large extent of those two elements.

 Timeliness
Timeliness refers to information that is current at the time of publication. Consider publication, creation and revision dates. Beware of Web site scripting that automatically reflects the current day’s date on a page.
 
 Reproducibility (utilized primarily when referring to instructive information)
Means that documented methods are capable of being used on the same data set to achieve a consistent result.

Professional associations
IQ International—the International Association for Information and Data Quality
IQ International is a not-for-profit, vendor neutral, professional association formed in 2004, dedicated to building the information and data quality profession.

Information quality conferences 
A number of major conferences relevant to information quality are held annually:
Annual MIT Chief Data Officer & Information Quality (CDOIQ) Symposium
Annual conferences held at the Massachusetts Institute of Technology, Cambridge, MA, USA

Data Governance and Information Quality Conference 
Commercial conferences held each year in the USA

Data Quality Asia Pacific
Commercial conference held annually in Sydney or Melbourne, Australia

Enterprise Data and Business Intelligence Conference Europe
Commercial conferences held annually in London, England.
Information and Data Quality Conference
Not for profit conference run annually by IQ International (the International Association for Information and Data Quality) in the USA
International Conference on Information Quality
Academic Conference launched through MITIQ held annually at a University
Master Data Management & Data Governance Conferences 
Six major conferences are run annually by the MDM Institute in venues such as London, San Francisco, Sydney, Toronto, Madrid, Frankfurt, Shanghai and New York City.

See also 
 Data quality
 Accuracy and precision
 Information pollution
 Information Quality (InfoQ)

References 

Information science
Data quality